Korah ( Qōraḥ;  Qārūn), son of Izhar, is an individual who appears in the Book of Numbers of the Hebrew Bible and four different verses in the Quran, known for leading a rebellion against Moses. Some older English translations, as well as the Douay–Rheims Bible, spell the name Core, and many Eastern European translations have Korak.

The name Korah is also used for at least one other individual in the Hebrew Bible: Korah (son of Esau).

In the Hebrew Bible

Genealogy

Exodus  cites Korah as being the son of Izhar, son of Kehath, son of Levi.  lists his three sons.

Numbers  traces this lineage back further to Levi, son of the patriarch Israel.

Rebellion
 indicates that Korah rebelled against Moses along with 249 co-conspirators and were punished for their rebellion when God sent fire from heaven to consume all 250 of them. Korah's Reubenite allies Dathan and Abiram were also punished when God caused the ground to split open beneath their feet swallowing them, their families, anyone associated with Korah, and all their possessions.

Furthermore, the Israelites who did not like what had happened to Korah, Dathan and Abiram (and their families) objected to Moses, and God then commanded Moses to depart from the multitude. God then smote 14,700 men with plague, as punishment for objecting to Korah's destruction (ff.)

"Notwithstanding, the children of Korah died not".

In rabbinical literature
The rabbis of the Talmudic era explained the name "Korah" as meaning "baldness." It was given to Korah on account of the gap or blank which he made in Israel by his revolt. Korah is represented as the possessor of extraordinary wealth, having discovered one of the treasures which Joseph had hidden in Egypt. The keys of Korah's treasuries alone formed a load for 300 mules. He and Haman were the two richest men in the world, and both died on account of their rapacity, and because their riches were not the gift of Heaven. On the other hand, Korah is represented as a wise man, chief of his family and as one of the Kohathites who carried the Ark of the Covenant on their shoulders.

Cause of revolt
According to the Rabbis, the main cause of Korah's revolt was the nomination of Elizaphan, son of Uzziel, as prince over the Kohathites, Korah arguing thus: "Kohath had four sons. The two sons of Amram, Kohath's eldest son, took for themselves the kingdom and the priesthood. Now, as I am the son of Kohath's second son, I should be made prince over the Kohathites; however Moses gave that office to Elizaphan, the son of Kohath's youngest son".

Korah asked Moses the following questions: "Does a tallit made entirely of tekhelet need fringes?" To Moses' affirmative answer Korah objected: "The blue color of the ṭallit does not make it ritually correct, yet according to your statement four blue threads do so". "Does a house filled with the books of the Law need a mezuzah?" Moses replied that it did; whereupon Korah said: "The presence of the whole Torah, which contains 175 chapters, does not make a house fit for habitation, yet you say that one chapter of it does so. It is not from God that you have received these commandments; you have invented them yourself." He then assembled 250 men, chiefs of the Sanhedrin, and, having clad them in tallitot of blue wool, but without fringes, prepared for them a banquet. Aaron's sons came for the priestly share, but Korah and his people refused to give the prescribed portions to them, saying that it was not God but Moses who commanded those things. Moses, having been informed of these proceedings, went to the house of Korah to effect a reconciliation, but the latter and his 250 followers rose up against him.

Korah consulted also his wife, who encouraged him in the revolt, saying: "See what Moses has done. He has proclaimed himself king; he has made his brother high priest, and his brother's sons priests; moreover, he has made you shave all your hair in order to disfigure you." Korah answered: "But he has done the same to his own sons." His wife replied: "Moses hated you so much that he was ready to do evil to his own children provided the same evil would overtake you".

Modern Jewish reform and secular interpretations of the Korah revolt supply new causes for the revolt to reflect new agendas and concerns of the authors.

Korah's parable

Korah incited all the people against Moses, arguing that it was impossible to endure the laws Moses had instituted. He told them the following parable: "A widow, the mother of two young daughters, had a field. When she came to plow it, Moses told her not to plow it with an ox and an ass together; when she came to sow it, Moses told her not to sow it with mingled seeds; At the time of harvest she had to leave unreaped the parts of the field prescribed by the Law, while from the harvested grain she had to give the priest the share due to him. The woman sold the field and with the proceeds bought two sheep. But the first-born of these she was obliged to give to Aaron the priest; and at the time of shearing he required the first of the fleece also. The widow said: 'I cannot bear this man's demands any longer. It will be better for me to slaughter the sheep and eat them.' But Aaron came for the shoulder, the two cheeks, and the maw. The widow then vehemently cried out: 'If you persist in your demand, I declare them devoted to the Lord.' Aaron replied: 'In that case the whole belongs to me', whereupon he took away the meat, leaving the widow and her two daughters wholly unprovided for".

The question how it was possible for a wise man like Korah to be so imprudent as to rebel is explained by the fact that he was deceived through his own prophetic ability. He had foreseen that the prophet Samuel would be his descendant, and therefore concluded that he himself would escape punishment. But he was mistaken; for, while his sons escaped, he perished.

Destruction of Korah

At the time of Korah's engulfment, the earth became like a funnel, and everything that belonged to him, even linen that was at the launderer's and needles that had been borrowed by persons living at a distance from Korah, rolled till it fell into the chasm. According to the Rabbis, Korah himself underwent the double punishment of being burned and buried alive. He and his followers continued to sink until Hannah prayed for them; and through her prayer, the Rabbis declare, Korah will ascend to paradise. Rabbah bar bar Hana narrates that while he was traveling in the desert, an Arab showed him the place of Korah's engulfment. There was at the spot a slit in the ground into which he introduced some wool soaked in water. The wool became parched. On placing his ear to the slit, he heard voices cry: "Moses and his Torah are true; and we are liars".

Other references 
Korah is referenced in the New Testament in : "Woe to them! They have taken the way of Cain; they have rushed for profit into Balaam's error; they have been destroyed in Korah's rebellion." (NIV)

The rebellion of Korah is also made reference to in chapter 11 of 2 Meqabyan, a book considered canonical in the Ethiopian Orthodox Tewahedo Church.

Korah is mentioned in the 1768 edition of The New England Primer.

Korah is also mentioned by Irenaeus in his anti-Gnostic work Against Heresies, written in about 180. He criticized the excuse that some evil people in the Bible were credited with obtaining their power from God. Specifically he wrote that there are some who "declare that Cain derived his being from the Power above, and acknowledge that Esau, Korah, the Sodomites, and all such persons, are related to themselves."

The Dead Sea Scrolls also provide additional details about Korah, though which Korah is not certain.

Quranic reference
Korah is also mentioned in the Quran by the name of Qārūn. He is recognized as wealthy, and became very arrogant due to his pride and ignorance. He gave the credit of his wealth to his knowledge instead of to God.

The Quran states he was punished due to his extreme arrogance by being swallowed by earth along with all his great material wealth.

In the Malay and Indonesian language, the term for treasure is literally Harta Karun ("Qarun's treasure"). It is also often referred to in Turkish as "Karun'un Hazineleri". In Muslim culture, he is referred to as a tyrant who is the epitome of arrogance based on wealth.

Other individuals named Korah

See also
 Karun Treasure
 Korach (parashah), the weekly Torah portion in the annual Jewish cycle of Torah reading that tells Korah's story.
 Korahites

References

Book of Numbers people
Tribe of Levi

id:Korah